Alejandro Matías Luis Ignacio Reyes Cotapos (24 February 1825 – 8 January 1884) was a Chilean lawyer and politician.

Life and career
Reyes was born in Santiago to Ignacio de Reyes Saravia and Micaela Pérez Cotapos de la Lastra. He married twice, first to  Hortensia Lavalle Correas, then Fanny Ovalle Vicuña. Reyes earned a degree in law from the University of Chile in 1845.

Throughout his political career, Reyes remained allied with Manuel Montt and Antonio Varas, whose supporters formally established the National Party in 1857. In 1849, Reyes was named an alternate member of the Chamber of Deputies from Caupolicán, but never took office. He began working for the Santiago municipal government in 1851. Reyes won his first parliamentary election the next year, taking a seat in the Chamber of Deputies as a representative of Los Ángeles and Yungay. He was reelected in 1855 from San Fernando and again in 1858, from Melipilla and La Victoria, a district of Santiago. As a legislator, Reyes served on the industry, treasury, and war committees.

Upon his return from exile in Europe in 1862, Reyes became a diplomat and helped reach treaties with Ecuador and Costa Rica. Later, Reyes aided in the drafting of the legal codes regulating commerce, civil actions, and criminal activity. He was Minister of Finance between 1864 and 1869. From 1868 to 1870, Reyes served as concurrently as interior and foreign minister. Reyes also returned to the Chamber of Deputies, representing Itata between 1863 and 1867. After his term ended, Reyes became a judge on the Santiago Appeals Court. He was appointed to the Supreme Court of Chile in 1870, and concurrently took office as a senator from Curicó. Reyes stepped down from the Senate in 1882, and relinquished his judgeship in 1883, before dying in Santiago on 8 January 1884. Outside of politics, Reyes nurtured an interest in winemaking, and started a vineyard in Buin.

References
 Diccionario Histórico y Biográfico de Chile; Fernando Castillo Infante, Lía Cortés y Jordi Fuentes; Editorial Zig-Zag, Santiago de Chile, 1996, page 440.
Alejandro Matías Luis Ignacio Reyes Cotapos Biblioteca Nacional de Chile 

1825 births
1884 deaths
Politicians from Santiago
Chief justices
National Party (Chile, 1857) politicians
Members of the Senate of Chile
Members of the Chamber of Deputies of Chile
University of Chile alumni
Supreme Court of Chile members
19th-century Chilean judges